The Speed Classic is a 1928 American silent action film directed by Bruce M. Mitchell and starring Rex Lease, Mildred Harris and Mitchell Lewis. It is now considered a lost film.

Synopsis
A young man obsessed with cars is dumped by his girlfriend, and goes on a binge in Mexico where he ends up in jail. His girlfriend has a change of heart and gets his released in time to compete in a major car race.

Cast
 Rex Lease as Jerry Thornton 
 Mildred Harris as Sheila Van Hauten 
 Mitchell Lewis as Mr. Thornton 
 James Mason as Pedro de Malpa 
 Helen Jerome Eddy as Keziah Stubbs 
 Otis Harlan as The Thirsty One 
 Garry O'Dell as Jonah 
 Jack Richardson as Speed Cop

References

Bibliography
 Munden, Kenneth White. The American Film Institute Catalog of Motion Pictures Produced in the United States, Part 1. University of California Press, 1997.

External links

1928 films
1920s action films
American auto racing films
American action films
Lost American films
Films directed by Bruce M. Mitchell
American silent feature films
American black-and-white films
Films set in Mexico
1928 lost films
Lost action films
1920s English-language films
1920s American films
Silent action films